Héverton is a given name. It may refer to:

 Héverton (footballer, born 1985), Héverton Durães Coutinho Alves, Brazilian football attacking midfielder
 Héverton (footballer, born 1988), Héverton Cardoso da Silva, Brazilian football centre-back

See also
 Everton (disambiguation)